Sub Ka Saathi is a 1972 Bollywood drama film directed by A. Bhimsingh. The film stars The film stars Vinod Khanna, Rakhee Gulzar and Sanjay Khan.

Plot
A family social film, strongly advocating national integration and economic equality, it tells of a millionaire's son, brought up by a Harijan (untouchable) couple, fighting against the evil machinations of his wealthy father to provide his kin the promised "uptopia" and also make his father repent for the manner in which he amassed his wealth.

Cast 
Vinod Khanna as Amar
Rakhee Gulzar as Rosy
Sanjay as Amrit
Bharthi as Chitra
Om Prakash as Seth Maya Das
Sulochna as Amar Mother
David as Victor

Soundtrack 
Yeh Waada karo Bagh Mein Na Aaya Karoge - Kishore Kumar
 Yeh Jaan Lo Pehchaan Lo Kaun Paraya Hai - Mohammed Rafi
 Dil To Dil Hai Sheesha To Nahin - Lata Mangeshkar
 Woh Aaye, Woh Baithe - Lata Mangeshkar

External links
 

1972 films
1970s Hindi-language films
1972 drama films
Films directed by A. Bhimsingh
Films scored by Kalyanji Anandji